Dirty Romance is a 2015 South Korean drama film written and directed by South Korean indie provocateur Lee Sang-woo. It made its world premiere at the 2015 Fantastic Fest.

Synopsis
Goo Chul-joong (Kim Joon-woo) struggles to survive as he takes care of his severely disabled sister Goo Mi-joong (Ahn Ha-na). With no income and in debt, he begs his uncle for handouts and resorts to stealing. For a long time, Mi-joong has a crush on his friend Kim Chang-gi (Choi Hong-jun) who has yet to repay his debt. One day, Chul-joong coerces Chang-gi to have sex with Mi-joong as partial payment of his longstanding debt. Chul-joong also allows Gil Deok-ho (Gil Deok-ho), the mentally challenged son of a Chinese restaurant owner, to court his sister, hoping to marry her off and extricate himself from this living hell.

Cast
 Kim Joon-woo as Goo Chul-joong
 Ahn Ha-na as Goo Mi-joong 
 Gil Deok-ho as Gil Deok-ho
 Choi Hong-jun as Kim Chang-gi
 Kim Dong-kyu as Kim Deok-gi
 Kim Hyo-sook as Kim Chang-gi's mother
 Jo Ha-suk as Hae-soo's father

Reception

References

External links
 
 
 

2015 films
South Korean drama films
2010s Korean-language films
Films directed by Lee Sang-woo
2010s South Korean films